Bela orientalis is a species of sea snail, a marine gastropod mollusk in the family Mangeliidae.

Description

Distribution
This marine species occurs off East Africa

References

 Thiele, J. 1925. Gastropoda der Deutschen Tiefsee-Expedition, 11. Wiss. Ergebn. dt. Tiefsee Exped. 'Valdivia' 17(2): 37-382

External links
  Tucker, J.K. 2004 Catalog of recent and fossil turrids (Mollusca: Gastropoda). Zootaxa 682:1-1295.

orientalis
Gastropods described in 1925